Dr. Christophe Fournier was the formal president of the Médecins Sans Frontières organisation (MSF).

Career
Fournier received an M.D. from the Université d'Auvergne in Clermont-Ferrand, France, and holds a degree in tropical medicine, epidemiology and biostatistics. He has worked as a doctor or head of mission in field projects in Burundi, Uganda, Honduras and Chile, as well as conducting emergency exploratory missions in Mexico and Venezuela. In 2000, he became MSF's operations manager, working in the United States, and managing field programs in Guatemala, Haiti, Nigeria, Sudan, Cambodia, Myanmar and Thailand. He became president in December 2006.

References
Fournier,  Christophe. 2009. Statement from Dr. Christophe Fournier, President of MSF International Council, on MSF expulsions from Darfur, Sudan. Médecins Sans Frontières / Doctors without Borders.

Living people
Year of birth missing (living people)
French tropical physicians
Médecins Sans Frontières